1921 is a 2018 Indian horror film, produced and directed by Vikram Bhatt, under his LoneRanger Productions banner. It stars Zareen Khan and Karan Kundrra in lead roles and was released on 12 January 2018. It is the first installment in the 1921 (film series) and also a spin-off from the 1920 film series. The film was declared an average grosser at box office.

Plot 
In the United Kingdom, 1927, a crowd waits for a performance to begin. The host apologizes for the delay and going backstage, furiously tells a lady called Nafisa to call Ayush, who has locked himself in a room. They break the door down to find out that Ayush has slit his wrist.

Then the film goes in flashback when he was in Bombay. A wealthy man Mr. Wadia discovers Ayush's incredible talents and asks him to take care of his mansion Wadia Manor in York in return of which he would pay for Ayush's educational expenses. Ayush is overjoyed to hear this and heads towards his journey to the mansion. Ayush is warmly received by both the housekeeper and the caretaker of the house. Ayush is more delighted to enter the York College of Music.

Three months later Ayush is doing some paperwork when he is hit with an onslaught of paranormal activities. Closed doors open by themselves. Lights start flickering. Ayush sees a white light beckoning him to come closer, but he is always stopped by a women's scream. He encounters a message written with dried blood in a room. He enlist help of Rose, a fellow student at the college who possesses a second sight. As both investigate, they realize the secrets that they both have kept individually about events of the preceding three months have more consequences and they both might have a deeper connection with the current hauntings than they can imagine. Ayush informs her that he can hear voices of a machine, and he can see a white light calling to him but as soon as he goes near he hears a woman's scream which prevents him from touching the light.

He narrates what happened three months ago when he arrived at the mansion. He allowed the villagers to enter the mansion and listen to his music for some money. One day his actions were discovered by Meher Wadia (Mr. Wadia's niece) and she blackmailed him into giving her a performance or she will have him fired. During the performance that night, she gave Ayush a poison and tried to dump him at a place so that he could die a slow death. But Ayush hit her making her unconscious. While coming back to the mansion, he saw a supernatural being on the way and lost control over the car, resulting in a car accident in which Meher died.

To his surprise, nobody confronted him about Meher's death. Later these paranormal events began. Rose conducts an investigation on the basis of Ayush's story. She learns that Meher Wadia never visited York. During their investigation, Ayush and Rose fall in love with each other. Some time later Rose reaches a hospital in which she discovers that the Meher Wadia who visited Ayush was actually their classmate Tina who had been dead for three months. When she sees the date of her death, she is horrified. She confesses to Ayush that all the bad things are happening to Ayush due to her.

She narrates how her and Nafisa's roommate Vasudha was in love with a married man named Richard, but he was not ready to divorce his wife. One day she happily informed her friends that Richard was going to marry her as Richard's wife left him. But Rose was visited by the spirit of Richard's wife and was told that Vasudha had murdered her. She informed Richard of this, which was  discovered by Vasudha and she committed suicide. They tried to save her and admitted her into a hospital. But she eventually died and her spirit got hold of Tina's body who was admitted in the same hospital. She had been tormenting Ayush since she knew that Rose was in love with him.

Rose and Ayush become convinced that they have to get rid of Vasudha's spirit and so they decide to visit a church. Vasudha attacks Nafisa, which prompts Rose to take her to a hospital where she makes another horrific discovery. She finds that Ayush is admitted into the same hospital and has been in a coma since the night Meher Wadia attacked him. Rose informs Nafisa that she has been communicating with Ayush's spirit all along. She explains that when the human body is in deep sleep, its spirit wanders off, but they are connected through a rope in the form of a white light. Eventually the spirit can re-enter the body by touching it. Ayush's spirit has tried to enter its body, but Vasudha has all along prevented it from happening. The next day Ayush's body was going to be removed from life support, which would result in his death.

Rose takes a hair of Ayush to make it touch Ayush's spirit, but as she is about to leave the hospital, Vasudha's spirit takes control of Ayush's body. She threatens Rose that she will destroy Ayush's body if she leaves. She tortures Rose by hurting Ayush's body. Rose informs Vasudha that she knew she would not be able to leave and then she kills herself. Her spirit appears and reveals that she has already sent Ayush's hair and a letter to Ayush through Nafisa. Rose fights and destroys Vasudha's spirit. At the same time, Ayush's spirit enters his body and he is saved.

The film goes back to where it has started. Ayush in a death-like state meets Rose and tells her that he wants to be with her. Rose tells him that he has to live and spread his music for her. She asks it as a return for her sacrifice. Ayush eventually recovers and becomes a renowned pianist and musician.

Cast 
 Zareen Khan as Rose
 Karan Kundra as Ayush
 Nidhi Chitrakar as Nafisa
 Aradhya Taing as Vasudha
 Angela Krislinzki as Dina Shaw/Meher Wadia 
 Toby Hinson as Mr Brett
 Sonnia Armstrong as Lilly Lopes
 Michael Edwards as Richard
 Vikram Bhatt as Mr. Wadia

Production

Development
The official announcement of the film was announced in June 2016. The title of the film was said to be 1921.

Casting
The makers of the film have decided to cast Zarine Khan as the lead role in the film.

Filming
The principal photography of the film commenced in May 2017 in United Kingdom.

Soundtrack

The music of 1921 is composed by Harish Sagane, Asad Khan and Pranit Mawale while the lyrics have been penned by Shakeel Azmi and Raqueeb Alam. The first track of the film titled as "Sunn Le Zara" which is sung by Arnab Dutta was released on 14 December 2017. The second single to be released was "Kuch Iss Tarah" which is also sung by Arnab Dutta was released on 21 December 2017. The music of the film was officially released by Zee Music Company on 22 December 2017.

Critical reception 

1921 received mostly negative reviews from critics upon its theatrical release.

Devesh Sharma of Filmfare gave the movie 2 out of 5 stars and wrote, "Vikram Bhatt has made an unintentionally funny film. He perhaps needs to go back to the drawing board before he takes up horror as a subject once more".

Reza Noorani of The Times of India gave the movie 2 out of 5 stars calling it "a slow-moving film without any real chills".

Shikta Sanyal of Koimoi gave the movie 2 out of 5 stars stating, "This Vikram Bhatt Film Is A Mixed Bag With Too Many Loose Ends"."

Udita Jhunjhunwala of Firstpost gave the movie 1.5 out of 5 stars stating, "Vikram Bhatt adds every horror trope to this ghastly film, but none of them work".

Urvi Parikh of Rediff.com gave the movie 1.5 out of 5 stars stating, "The terrible acting leaves you more amused than scared".

Rahul Desai of Film Companion gave the movie 1 out of 5 stars saying that it uses the same old tropes of haunted mansions and incoherent ghosts with deafening sound effects.

References

External links
 
 

2010s Hindi-language films
2018 films
2018 horror films
Films set in 1921
Films set in 1927
2010s historical horror films
Films set in Mumbai
Films set in the British Raj
Films scored by Asad Khan
Films set in York
Indian historical horror films
Reliance Entertainment films
Films shot in Greater Manchester